General elections were held in the Bahamas in June and July 1949, the last entirely non-partisan elections in the country. This was the second election in which the secret ballot was used in New Providence and the first in which the secret ballot was use for the Out Islands.

Elected MPs

References

Elections in the Bahamas
General election
Bahamas
Non-partisan elections
Nahamas
Election and referendum articles with incomplete results